NACTA may refer to:

National Counter Terrorism Authority of Pakistan
National Academy of Chinese Theatre Arts of China